DeWoody is a surname. Notable people with the surname include:

Beth Rudin DeWoody (born 1952), American art patron
James DeWoody (born 1945), American painter
Joseph DeWoody, American businessman
Kyle DeWoody, American curator